The Jagannath Temple in New Delhi, India is a modern temple built by the Odia community of Delhi dedicated to the Hindu God Jagannath. The temple located in Hauz Khas is famous for its annual Rathyatra festival attended by thousands of devotees.

Address: C-Block, Safdarjung Deplopment Area, Bhagwan Jagannath Mg, Hauz Khas Vill- Rd, Hauz Khas, Delhi - 110016

References

Temples dedicated to Jagannath
Hindu temples in Delhi